, also known as Doraemon: The Movie 2006 and Doraemon and the Little Dinosaur, is a 2006 Japanese animated science fiction adventure film which is a remake of the first, 1980, Doraemon film Doraemon: Nobita's Dinosaur. The new film was released theatrically in Japan on 4 March 2006 & was released theatrically in United States on 10 April 2006. It's the 26th Doraemon film. The film got a private screening with English subtitles in Washington, D.C. on 14 November 2008, making it the first time Doraemon made an appearance in the US. The movie grossed over 3.28 billion yen.

This movie was ranked 6th highest-grossing movie and the highest grossing animated movie in 2006 of Japan & United States. It was the first to feature the new Doraemon cast and implement a new animation style. Following the end credits, the movie had a teaser for another movie. A sequel titled Doraemon: Nobita's New Dinosaur, was released on 7 August 2020.

Plot 

Suneo shows everyone a fossilized claw of Tyrannosaurus rex and Nobita is angry that he doesn't get a look. Nobita claims that he will be able to find a living dinosaur. Panicking, Nobita researches dinosaurs and starts digging in a hill. But then, a landlord shouts at him and makes him dig a hole in the ground to dispose of some egg shells. Nobita unearths a rock shaped like an egg. Using the time-wrap, he returns the rock to its former form and plans to hatch the egg. He spends a day and night wrapped tightly in a blanket with it on his futon, despite it being the peak of summer. A plesiosaur Futabasaurus comes out, and Nobita decides to name the plesiosaur Piisuke. Suneo and Gian come looking for Nobita but because Piisuke is still too small, Nobita doesn't show them the plesiosaur and instead makes a deal with them. If he cannot show them a real dinosaur, he would have to eat spaghetti through his nose. Meanwhile, Nobita and Piisuke form a strong bond between them with Nobita working very hard to make sure the baby plesiosaur is well looked after, feeding it his own dinner of sashimi and playing with it. He grows very attached to Piisuke.

Piisuke grows too big to stay in Nobita's closet and has to be moved to a lake. Nobita continues to visit him every night, bringing him food and playing with him. However, Nobita becomes sick and can't make it one night. Doraemon tries to feed Piisuke instead but comes home saying Piisuke is gone. It turns out though that because Nobita didn't show up Piisuke came looking for him. At first Nobita is angry that Piisuke came into town but doesn't stay angry long. Doraemon takes Piisuke back to the lake once the plesiosaur sees Nobita is ok. However, the next day when Nobita goes to visit him he hears that Piisuke was seen and when he gets to the lake it's flooded with reporters. Nobita is unable to get to Piisuke without being seen and goes home.

When night comes, Nobita goes back to the lake to try to get Piisuke away from the reporters. Doraemon acts as a distraction while Nobita uses the shrink and enlarge torch to shrink Piisuke so that he'd get in a cooler box. He escapes with Piisuke and he and Doraemon use the time machine to take Piisuke back to the Late Cretaceous. On the way there however the time machine is attacked by hunters from the future who intend to capture Piisuke. Nobita, Doraemon and Piisuke manage to escape but the time machine is damaged. They leave Piisuke in prehistoric times and return home with Nobita crying the entire way.

Gian and Suneo show up at Nobita's home and he's forced to eat a giant plate of spaghetti through his nose as he failed to show them a dinosaur. He tries to convince them that he does have a dinosaur but they don't believe him. When he goes to Shizuka's house to complain she doesn't believe him either. Angry, Nobita uses one of Doraemon's gadgets to show his friends Piisuke back in prehistoric times. However, they see Piisuke being bullied by sharp-toothed Elasmosaurus. Doraemon says because they were attacked while on the time machine they've accidentally left Piisuke in Cretaceous America instead of Japan. Nobita immediately drags every-one back to the time machine against Doraemon's advice and they return to Cretaceous America to save Piisuke.

They find Piisuke and Nobita introduces him to his friends, which also results in them apologizing for their previous behaviour towards Nobita. They plan to take Piisuke back to modern times and then to Cretaceous Japan. Doraemon however suggests that there's no hurry and they should have a camp-out; the reason being that the time machine has been badly damaged and Doraemon hopes to fix it before the others notice. However, when they're attacked by a Tyrannosaurus rex and the kids want to go home Doraemon admits that the time machine is broken. At first the kids are scared but Doraemon says they can use the bamboo-copters to go to Cretaceous Japan to take Piisuke back home and they set off on a long journey to do so, exploring the prehistoric world as they go. They then befriend a flock of Ornithomimus with Doraemon's special dumplings, who give them a ride before dropping them off at a lake. There, the group encounter a herd of Alamosaurus and are once again attacked by a Tyrannosaurus, but they tame it with the dumplings.

Then, after getting chased by a flock of Quetzalcoatlus, they are cornered by dinosaur hunters from the future, who want to take Piisuke from him. They say they will consider it and during the night, they make clay figures of themselves, put into clay cars controlled by a remote. The next day, their plan is discovered, Shizuka, Gian and Suneo are captured. Doraemon and Nobita rush to save them and all five have to face being eaten by a ferocious Tyrannosaurus. As it nears, they realize that it was one of the tame dinosaurs and chase the hunters with it, as well as defeating the hunter's pet Spinosaurus. The Time Police arrives on scene to discover the hunters in a cage, and the group gone. The five decides to walk to Japan by themselves and encounters the Time Police, who acknowledges their heroic actions with a salute. Piisuke is taken back to where he belongs in Japan and all five of them return home.

Using the time machine, they return to a few days before they went to the prehistoric era. Nobita's mom asks why they all pass by, Nobita says, "We have something to do!"

Cast

Music 
  by Rimi Natsukawa
  by Sukima Switch

References

External links 
 Official website (archived)
 

Films directed by Ayumu Watanabe
Dinosaurs in anime and manga
Animated films about dinosaurs
English-language films
Anime film remakes
Nobita's Dinosaur 2006
Plesiosaurs in fiction
2006 anime films
Toho films
Animated films about time travel
2000s children's animated films